Harpalpur railway station is a small railway station in Chhatarpur district, Madhya Pradesh. Its code is HPP and serves Harpalpur town. The station consists of two platforms, not well sheltered. It lacks many facilities including water and sanitation.

Before the inauguration of Khajuraho railway station, Harpalpur was the only railway station in Chhatarpur district.

References 

Jhansi railway division
Railway stations in Chhatarpur district